The Tajikistan First League is the second division of the Tajikistan Football Federation.

Teams

League table

Season statistics

Top scorers

References

Tajikistan First League seasons
1
Tajik